Hove Mobile Park is a former city in Cavalier County, North Dakota, United States. The population was 2 at the 2000 census. According to the United States Census Bureau it was one of only five places in the United States with a population of two people. The others were Twombly, Maine; Success, New Hampshire; Oil Springs Reservation, Cattaraugus County, New York; and Monowi, Nebraska. The city government of Hove Mobile Park was dissolved in 2002.

Geography
Hove Mobile Park is located at  (48.58249, -98.229481), 174 miles from Bismarck.

Demographics
As of the census of 2000, there was one married couple living in the city. Both were white and above 65, and their median age was 74 years. The population density was 52.1 people per square mile (19.3/km). There was one housing unit at an average density of 26.1/sq mi (9.7/km).

References

Unincorporated communities in Cavalier County, North Dakota
Unincorporated communities in North Dakota
Former municipalities in North Dakota
2002 disestablishments in North Dakota
Populated places disestablished in 2002